The Embassy of the United States of America in Prague is the diplomatic mission of the United States of America in the Czech Republic. The chancery is located on Vlašská street in Malá Strana, Prague, where it occupies the historic Schönborn Palace and possesses an extensive garden.

The premises also include the American Center, a public research facility, library and venue for lectures on American history, politics, science and culture. Past lecturers include Greil Marcus, Patricia Hampl, David Woodard, Gene Deitch and many others.

History

World War II
By concurrent decrees of the German and Czechoslovakian governments, Czechoslovakia was dissolved on March 16, 1939, with the Czech lands becoming a protectorate of Germany, and Slovakia becoming an independent state. The next day, ambassador William Carr telegrammed the United States Department of State that "there are no officials of the Czechoslovakian government, to which I am accredited with, whom I can maintain for protection of the interests of the United States and its citizens". Three days later, acting on orders of the United States government, the United States embassy in Prague terminated its mission. The legation and other property of the embassy was, thereafter, transferred to the Consulate-General of the United States in Prague and ambassador Carr returned to the United States. The Consulate-General itself was moved under the jurisdiction of the Embassy of the United States, Berlin.

Gallery

See also
 United States Ambassador to the Czech Republic
 United States Ambassador to Czechoslovakia

References

External links
 
 Official website

United States
Prague
Czech Republic–United States relations
Czechoslovakia–United States relations